Mamie Elizabeth Till-Mobley (born Mamie Elizabeth Carthan; November 23, 1921 – January 6, 2003) was an American educator and activist. She was the mother of Emmett Till, the 14-year-old boy murdered in Mississippi on August 28, 1955, after accusations that he had whistled at a white woman, a grocery store cashier named Carolyn Bryant. For Emmett's funeral, in Chicago, Mamie Till insisted that the casket containing his body be left open, because, in her words, "I wanted the world to see what they did to my baby."

Born in Mississippi, she had moved, as a child, with her parents to the Chicago area during the "Great Migration". After her son's murder, she became an educator and activist in the Civil Rights Movement.

Early life
Born Mamie Elizabeth Carthan on November 23, 1921 in Webb, Mississippi, she was a young child when her family relocated from the Southern United States during the Great Migration, the period when hundred thousands of African-Americans moved to the Northern United States.

In 1922, shortly after her birth, her father, Nash Carthan, moved to Argo, Illinois, near Chicago. There, he found work at the Argo Corn Products Refining Company. Alma Carthan joined her husband in January 1924, bringing along two-year-old Mamie and her brother, John. They settled in a predominantly African-American neighborhood in Argo.

When Mamie was 13, her parents divorced. Devastated, she threw herself into her school work and excelled in her studies. Alma had high hopes for her only daughter, and although Alma Carthan said that in her day "the girls had one ambition—to get married", she encouraged Mamie in her studies. Mamie was the first African-American student to make the "A" Honor roll and only the fourth African-American student to graduate from the predominantly white Argo Community High School.

At age 18, she met a young man from New Madrid, Missouri named Louis Till. Employed by the Argo Corn Company, he was an amateur boxer, who was popular with women. Her parents disapproved, thinking the charismatic Till was "too sophisticated" for their daughter. At her mother's insistence, she broke off their courtship. But the persistent Till won out, and they married on October 14, 1940. Both were 18 years old.

Their only child, Emmett, was born nine months later. They separated in 1942 after Mamie found out that he had been unfaithful. Louis later choked her close to unconsciousness, to which she responded by throwing scalding water at him. Eventually, she obtained a restraining order against him. After Louis violated this repeatedly, a judge forced him to choose between enlistment in the U.S. Army or jail time. Choosing the former, he joined the Army in 1943.

In 1945, Ms. Till received notice from the War Department that, while serving in Italy, her husband was executed due to "willful misconduct". Her attempts to learn more were comprehensively blocked by the United States Army bureaucracy. The full details of Louis Till's criminal charges and execution emerged only ten years later. He (along with accomplice Fred A. McMurray) had been charged with raping an Italian woman. Both men were tried and convicted by a U.S. Army general court-martial and their sentence was death by hanging. Their sentence was appealed but denied. Both of their bodies were buried near the First World War U.S. Cemetery located at Oise-Aisne in an area known as Plot E, or the Fifth Field. Later analysis of the trial by John Edgar Wideman would call Louis Till's guilt into question.

By the early 1950s, Mamie and Emmett had moved to Chicago's South Side. Mamie met and married "Pink" Bradley, but they divorced two years later.

Murder of Emmett Till
In 1955, when Emmett was 14, his mother put him on the train to spend the summer visiting his cousins in Money, Mississippi.  She never saw him alive again.  Her son was abducted and brutally murdered on August 28, 1955, after being accused of interacting inappropriately with a white woman. The following month, Roy Bryant and his half-brother J.W. Milam faced trial for Till's kidnapping and murder but were acquitted by the all-white jury after a five-day trial and a 67-minute deliberation. One juror said "If we hadn't stopped to drink pop, it wouldn't have taken that long." Only months later, in an interview with Look magazine in 1956, protected against double jeopardy, Bryant and Milam admitted to killing Emmett Till.

For her son's funeral, Till insisted that the casket containing his body be left open, because, in her words "I wanted the world to see what they did to my baby."  Tens of thousands of people viewed Emmett's body, and photographs circulated the country. Through the constant attention it received, the Till case became emblematic of the disparity of justice for blacks in the South. The NAACP asked Mamie Till to tour the country relating the events of her son's life, death, and the trial of his murderers. It was one of the more successful fundraising campaigns the NAACP had known.

Activism 
After her son's murder, it became quickly evident that Till-Mobley was an effective public speaker.   She enjoyed a close relationship with many African-American media outlets, and the NAACP hired her to go on a speaking tour around the country and share her son's story. This was one of the most successful fundraising tours in NAACP history, though it was cut short by a business dispute with NAACP executive secretary Roy Wilkins over payment for her being on tour.  Till-Mobley continued speaking out, and in an effort to influence the jury during the trial of her son's murderers she flew to Mississippi and provided testimony. 

Till-Mobley's activism extended far beyond what she did in the wake of her son's death. However, since her Emmett's death became symbolic of the lynchings of the mid-1950s, she remains most well-known in that context.  For this, and all her activism, Till-Mobley was able to use her role as a mother to relate to other people, and gain support for the cause of racial justice.

A large part of her work and activism centered around education, as she advocated for children living in poverty for over 40 years, including 23 years teaching in the Chicago public school system.  Ms. Till-Mobley established "The Emmett Till Players," a theater group that worked with school children outside of the classroom, learning and performing famous speeches by civil rights leaders such as Martin Luther King Jr to inspire hope, unity, and determination to their audiences.

Later life and education
Till graduated from Chicago Teachers College in 1960 (now Chicago State University, 1971). She married Gene Mobley on June 24, 1957. She became a teacher, changed her surname to Till-Mobley, and continued her life as an activist working to educate people about what happened to her son.

In 1971, she obtained a master's degree in educational administration from Loyola University Chicago.

In 1992, Till-Mobley had the opportunity to listen while Roy Bryant was interviewed about his involvement in her son's murder. With Bryant unaware that Till-Mobley was listening, he asserted that Emmett Till had ruined his life. He expressed no remorse and stated, "Emmett Till is dead. I don't know why he can't just stay dead."

Mamie and Gene Mobley remained happily married until Gene's death from a stroke on March 18, 2000.

Death
On January 6, 2003, Till-Mobley died of heart failure at the age of 81.  Till-Mobley was buried near her son in Burr Oak Cemetery, where her monument reads, "Her pain united a nation."

Memoir 
Till-Mobley coauthored with Christopher Benson her memoir, Death of Innocence: The Story of the Hate Crime that Changed America, published by Random House in 2003, almost 50 years after the death of her son. She died a few months before the publication of her book.

Legacy
Till-Mobley created the Emmett Till Players, a student group that traveled to deliver works about "hope, determination, and unity."  She also founded and chaired the Emmett Till Justice Campaign.  The campaign group eventually succeeded in getting enacted into law the Emmett Till Unsolved Civil Rights Crime Act of 2008" and the "Emmett Till Unsolved Civil Rights Crimes Reauthorization Act of 2016."

Whoopi Goldberg announced in 2015 plans for a film called Till, based on Till-Mobley's book and her play, The Face of Emmett Till. Danielle Deadwyler played Till-Mobley, with newcomer Jalyn Hall as Emmett and Goldberg as Alma Carthan. The film, directed by Chinonye Chukwu, was theatrically released on October 14, 2022.

Till-Mobley is portrayed by Adrienne Warren in the six-part 2022 television drama Women of the Movement.

Congress awarded Till-Mobley and Emmett Till a posthumous Congressional Gold Medal in 2022, to be put on display at the National Museum of African American History.

In 2023, a statue of Till-Mobley in a plaza dedicated to her is planned to be unveiled in front of the Argo Community High School, where she graduated as an honor student, in Summit, Illinois.

Notes

References

Bibliography
 Federal Bureau of Investigation (February 9, 2006). Prosecutive Report of Investigation Concerning (Emmett Till) (Flash Video or PDF). Retrieved October 2011.
 Hampton, Henry, Fayer, S. (1990). Voices of Freedom: An Oral History of the Civil Rights Movement from the 1950s through the 1980s. Bantam Books. 
 Houck, Davis; Grindy, Matthew (2008). Emmett Till and the Mississippi Press, University Press of Mississippi. 
 Till-Mobley, Mamie; Benson, Christopher (2003). The Death of Innocence: The Story of the Hate Crime That Changed America'', Random House. 
 Whitaker, Hugh Stephen (1963). A Case Study in Southern Justice: The Emmett Till Case, Florida State University (M.A. thesis). Retrieved October 2010.
 Whitfield, Stephen (1991). A Death in the Delta: The story of Emmett Till, JHU Press.

External links
Interview with Mamie Till Mobley for the WGBH series American Experience: The Murder of Emmett Till
Mamie Till Mobley Enterprise, Inc.
PBS Timeline
Washington Post obituary
"Mamie Till-Mobley" from the  WGBH series, The Ten O'clock News
Mamie Till a Guest on Democracy Now! (audio)
 

1921 births
2003 deaths
20th-century American educators
20th-century American women educators
20th-century African-American women
20th-century African-American educators
21st-century African-American people
21st-century African-American women
Activists for African-American civil rights
Activists from Chicago
Burials at Burr Oak Cemetery
Chicago State University alumni
Loyola University Chicago alumni
People from Summit, Illinois
People from Tallahatchie County, Mississippi
Schoolteachers from Illinois
Till family
Congressional Gold Medal recipients